Psectrotarsia rhodophora is a species of moth of the family Noctuidae. It is only known from Guatemala.

The length of the forewings is 13.0–17.5 mm. Adults have been recorded in October and November.

External links
 Species info Revision of the Genus Psectrotarsia Dognin, 1907 (Lepidoptera: Noctuidae: Heliothinae)

Heliothinae